Michel Artola (21 February 1882 – 25 March 1936) was a French equestrian. He competed at the 1920 Summer Olympics and the 1924 Summer Olympics.

References

External links
 

1882 births
1936 deaths
French male equestrians
Olympic equestrians of France
Equestrians at the 1920 Summer Olympics
Equestrians at the 1924 Summer Olympics
People from Saint-Jean-de-Luz